Russia participated in the Eurovision Song Contest 2002 in Tallinn, Estonia. The Russian entry was selected internally by the Russian broadcaster Russian Public Television (ORT). Prime Minister represented Russia with the song "Northern Girl", which placed 10th and scored 55 points at the contest.

Before Eurovision

Internal selection 
On 17 January 2002, ORT announced a submission period for interested artists and composers to submit their entries until 26 February 2002. The broadcaster received 11,742 submissions at the conclusion of the deadline, including entries from Arkady Ukupnik, Diana Gurtskaya and Vitas. 25 entries were shortlisted from the received submissions and a jury panel selected the Russian entry. The jury consisted of Konstantin Ernst (general manager of C1R), Aleksandr Fifeman (general producer of ORT), Marina Danielyan (service manager of ORT), Ilya Bachurin (music director of ORT), Valdis Pelšs (television presenter and entertainment director of ORT), Lev Leshchenko (singer), Oleg Gazmanov (singer), Ilya Reznik (lyricist) and Igor Matvienko (composer and producer).

On 4 March 2002, C1R announced during a press conference that they had internally selected Prime Minister to represent Russia in Tallinn with the song "Northern Girl". Prime Minister's selection as the Russian representative was decided upon by the jury panel from two entries considered: "Northern Girl" performed by Prime Minister and "All My Love" performed by Kristina Orbakaitė. "Northern Girl" was composed by Kim Breitburg, with lyrics by Karen Kavaleryan, Evgeniy Fridlyand and Irina Antonyan. The song was presented to the public on 13 April 2002 through the release of the official music video, directed by Sergey Kalvarsky.

At Eurovision
Russia performed 7th at the 2002 Contest, following Croatia and preceding Estonia. Premier Ministr anglicized their band name and appeared in the contest as Prime Minister. After the voting concluded, Russia scored 55 points and placed 10th.

The voting spokesperson for Russia was Arina Sharapova.

Voting

References

2002
Countries in the Eurovision Song Contest 2002
Eurovision